Cady Pond is a lake in Middlesex County, in the U.S. state of Massachusetts.

Cady Pond was named after Nicholas Cady, a pioneer citizen.

Nicholas Cady [of Suffolk county England] and wife Judith Knapp Cady did resided near the pond in the last years of their lives.  Died prior to 1712. There is no marker of their graves.

References

Lakes of Middlesex County, Massachusetts